"The Frost-Giant's Daughter" is one of the original fantasy short stories about Conan the Cimmerian, written by American author Robert E. Howard.

The story is set in the fictional history of the Hyborian Age and details Conan pursuing a spectral nymph across the frozen tundra of Nordheim. Rejected as a Conan story by Weird Tales magazine editor Farnsworth Wright, Howard changed the main character's name to "Amra of Akbitana" and retitled the piece as "The Gods of the North", as which it was published in the March 1934 issue of The Fantasy Fan. It was not published in its original form in Howard's lifetime.

Plot summary

"The Frost-Giant's Daughter" is the earliest chronological story by Robert E. Howard in terms of Conan's life. The brief tale is set in frozen Nordheim, geographically situated north of Conan's homeland, Cimmeria. Conan is a young warrior traveling in a war party of the Aesir, a barbarian people inspired on the main gods of Norse mythology. Shortly before the story begins, a melee has occurred on an icy plain. Eighty men have perished, and Conan alone survives the battlefield where Wulfhere's Aesir "reavers" faced the "wolves" of Bragi, a chieftain of the Vanir, another barbarian group based on Norse gods.

Following his battle with the red-haired Vanir, Conan, lying exhausted, is visited by a beautiful partially-nude woman identifying herself as "Atali". Upon her bodice, she wears a transparent veil: a wisp of gossamer that wasn't spun by human origin. The sight of her awakens Conan's lust and, when she repeatedly taunts him, he chases Atali across the snow-covered region.

Mocking him with each step, Atali lures Conan into an ambush. Undaunted by the snare, Conan slays her twin brothers, two Frost Giants, and captures Atali in his arms. Atali calls upon her father, Ymir, to save her. Before Conan can ravish her, Atali disappears in a stroke of lightning which transforms the landscape and renders him unconscious.

When his Aesir comrades arrive, Conan believes he dreamed the encounter. Then Conan realizes he's still gripping a veil, the sole garment of the Frost-Giant's daughter.

Inspiration
While Robert E. Howard had already written many fantasy stories featuring northern Viking-like characters, the names and plot structure for "The Frost-Giant's Daughter" were derived in their entirety from Thomas Bulfinch's The Outline of Mythology (1913). Howard combined the legend of Atalanta with another reworked Bulfinch legend, that of Daphne and Apollo, but he reversed the roles. Whereas Apollo was a god and Daphne a mortal, Howard made Atali a goddess and Conan a mortal. In the original, Cupid had struck Apollo with an arrow to excite love for Daphne but struck her with an arrow to cause her to find love repellent. Howard kept the idea of the love-maddened Apollo (here a lust-maddened Conan) pursuing the girl until she invokes aid from her divine father.

Publication history
The earlier version of the story was published in the collections The Coming of Conan (Gnome Press, 1953) and Conan of Cimmeria (Lancer Books, 1969). The last version, as left by Howard before his death, was first published in 1976 by Donald M. Grant in an edition of the Conan story Rogues in the House. This version has most recently been republished in the collections The Conan Chronicles Volume 1: The People of the Black Circle (Gollancz, 2000) and The Coming of Conan the Cimmerian (Del Rey, 2004).

Adaptations
The story has been adapted into comics:

 Savage Tales #1 (Marvel Comics, May 1971, scripted by Roy Thomas and drawn by Barry Windsor-Smith)
 Conan the Barbarian #16 (Marvel Comics, July 1972), a censored reprint of the Savage Tales story with a new opening page.
 Savage Sword of Conan #1 (Marvel Comics, Aug 1974), a reprint of the Savage Tales story with the opening page from Conan the Barbarian.
 Conan #2 (Dark Horse Comics, Mar 2004) and reprinted as Robert E Howard's The Frost-Giant's Daughter.
 The Cimmerian: The Frost-Giant's Daughter by Ablaze Comics, 2020. A three-issue miniseries focusing on Atali and featuring a reprint of Howard's story in the back pages.

The story was also adapted into the prologue to the unproduced sequel King Conan: Crown of Iron written by screenwriter/director John Milius. In the screenplay, Conan encounters the Frost-Giant's Daughter and defeats her brothers, as in the original. But in Milius' adaptation, he is not interrupted by Ymir and impregnates Atali, who then disappears in apparent fear of "The Ice Worm". She bears him a son named Kon, whose parentage is important to the story.

The 2018 video game Conan Exiles features a boss NPC named Ladagara, Daughter of Ymir, a larger than normal NPC which may spawn in the Nordheimer settlement of New Asagarth who is the daughter of the frost giant god, Ymir. Upon slaying Ladagara, Daughter of Ymir, the player receives a Horn of the North drop that summons a frost giant pet to their side when used. The Warmaker's Sanctuary dungeon in Conan Exiles also features a nod to The Frost Giant's Daughter, with the Archivist's Assistant miniboss dropping a manuscript entitled The Daughter of Ymir that grants a player a temporary +4 buff in agility for 60 minutes after use.

Notes

References

External links

 
 Conan the Barbarian at AmratheLion.com
 Conan.com: The official website
 
 Gods of the North audiobook with video at YouTube
 Gods of the North audiobook at Libsyn

1932 short stories
Conan the Barbarian stories by Robert E. Howard
Pulp stories
Fantasy short stories
Horror short stories
Works originally published in Weird Tales
Short stories published posthumously
Ymir
Works based on classical mythology